The Gilbert River is a tributary of the Multnomah Channel on Sauvie Island in the U.S. state of Oregon.

The river loses only  of elevation between source and mouth. Its three named tributaries from source to mouth are Ash, Jack, and Mud sloughs, and it connects by water to a complex of lakes across the island including Steelman, Round, Gay, Racetrack, Malarky, and McNary, as well as Sturgeon.

The river is navigable by canoes and shallow-draft boats between Sturgeon Lake and the mouth. A mooring float with no shore access lies about a quarter mile from the mouth.

The stream was named for a Hudson's Bay Company employee, a French Canadian named Gilbert, said to have drowned in the river. Gilbert was a trapper during the fur-trading era.

See also
List of rivers of Oregon

References

Rivers of Columbia County, Oregon
Rivers of Multnomah County, Oregon
Rivers of Oregon
Sauvie Island